Ahmed Shehzad (born 23 November 1991) is a Pakistani international cricketer. 

He is an opening batsman who made his One Day International and Twenty20 International debut for Pakistan in April 2009 against Australia.

Personal life 
Shehzad was born on 23 November 1991 in the city of Lahore. He was born into a Pashtun family of the Afridi clan and, outside English and Urdu, he can speak Pashto as well. When Shehzad was two years old his father died and he was raised by a single mother in a street near the famous Anarkali marketplace.

On 19 September 2015, Shehzad married Sana, his childhood friend. They had a baby boy in 2017. In 2021, they had a second baby, a daughter.

Domestic and T20 career
Ahmad Shehzad was the highest run scorer in BPL 2011-12 and the best batsman of the tournament.

He is the title winner of BPL 2016 and PSL 2019 as champion in BPL he was playing in Comilla Victorians in 2016 and Quetta Gladiators.
Shehzad was the leading run-scorer in the 2016–17 Departmental One Day Cup, with 653 runs, including a career-best score in List A cricket of 166 in the semi-final. He was also the captain of the team. During the tournament he scored three centuries and three half-centuries in nine matches.

He was the highest runs scorer and man of the tournament in 2016 Pakistan Cup. He scored 372 runs in only 5 matches with the help of 3 half centuries and a hundred.

In April 2018, he was named as the captain of Balochistan's squad for the 2018 Pakistan Cup. He scored the most runs for Baluchistan during the tournament, with 251 runs in four matches. In March 2019, he was named in Federal Areas' squad for the 2019 Pakistan Cup.

He failed a doping test in 2018 and was banned for 10 weeks.

In July 2019, he was selected to play for the Amsterdam Knights in the inaugural edition of the Euro T20 Slam cricket tournament. However, the following month the tournament was cancelled.

In September 2019, he was named in Central Punjab's squad for the 2019–20 Quaid-e-Azam Trophy tournament. He was retained by Central Punjab for the 2020–21 domestic season. In November 2021, he was selected to play for the Colombo Stars following the players' draft for the 2021 Lanka Premier League.

International career

Shehzad made his first-class debut in 2007. The innings which led to a call-up for the national team was a 167 he scored in Pakistan Youth's victory against England.

Shehzad made his Test debut against Sri Lanka in 2013 scoring 38 in the first innings and 55 in the second.
Ahmed Shehzad was part of the Test squad against South Africa in UAE. However he wasn't selected in the playing XI in either of the 2 Tests against South Africa.

He has a 40+ test average for Pakistan Cricket Team with the help of 3 hundreds and 3 half centuries. His test hundreds have been scored against Sri Lanka where he scored 147 runs, Australia where he scored 136 runs and New Zealand where he scored 176 runs

In his One Day International career he has scored 6 hundreds and 14 half centuries. In his Twenty20 International career, he has scored 1 hundred 7 fifties. He is First Pakistani player who has scored a century in all three forms of cricket.

Controversies
Shehzad was issued a one-match ban in 2011 for showing dissent in the Quaid-e-Azam Trophy, one month before being issued a fine on disciplinary grounds.

The Pakistan Cricket Board (PCB) issued Shehzad an official reprimand after his frequent quarrels with Sri Lankan batsman Tillakaratne Dilshan about Dilshan's conversion from Islam to Buddhism. Shehzad was caught on camera telling Dilshan: 

During a Pakistan Super League group stage match vs Peshawar Zalmi, Shehzad had an exchange of words and physical conflict with bowler Wahab Riaz. The Pakistan Cricket Board (PCB) imposed a fine on both players and issued an official warning to them.

Records and achievements
Source:
First Pakistani to score 0 in his first 3 matches.
First Pakistani batsman to have scored centuries in all international formats of the game (i.e. Test, ODI and T20I).
 2nd Most runs (111*) and 2nd most sixes (6) in a T20I innings by a Pakistani.
 Most runs (168) in a two–match T20I series by a Pakistani cricketer.
 He is 2nd fastest 5000 runs scorer in T20 cricket from Pakistan
 He is 2nd highest centuries maker in T20 cricket from Asia after Rohit Sharma and Babar Azam.
 Highest run scorer for the Lahore Lions.
 Second quickest batsman to score centuries in all three formats of international cricket (76 innings) just behind Lokesh Rahul.
 Highest run scorer for the Quetta Gladiators until 2021.
 First Pakistani batsman to hit three consecutive sixes in T20I.
 Holds the record for the most boundaries in a single T20 inning (20 fours)
 He is the first Pakistani who scored hundred against Cricket South Africa in South Africa
 He is youngest Pakistani player who scored 150+ runs in a test inning
 He had the record of fastest century in t20 Cricket from Pakistan just in 40 balls until 2020 
 He had the record of highest t20i partnership for Pakistan along with Mohammad Hafeez 143* until 2021
 He has the record of Most catches in the field for Pakistan national under-19 cricket team
 He has the record of 2nd Most centuries from Pakistan in t20 Cricket 5 centuries
 He has the record of Most Half centuries for Quetta Gladiators in Pakistan Super League
 He has the record of Most centuries in knockout t20 matches 3 centuries
 He has the record of Most Half centuries in the finals of Pakistan Super League 2 half centuries in 3 finals
 He scored first half century of tournament in Kashmir Premier League history
 Being captain he scored 630+ runs with the help of 3 centuries and 3 half centuries in nine games of departmental one day cup 2016 and won the final for his team HBL   and got the award of Man of the final
 He was man of the tournament in BPL 2012.
 He scored 341 runs with the average of 51 for Quetta Gladiators in 4th edition of PSL and lift the trophy for his team first time

References

External links
 Official Facebook
 Cricinfo Profile
 Ahmed Shehzad's profile page on Wisden

1991 births
Living people
Pashtun people
Afridi people
Doping cases in Pakistani cricket
Punjab (Pakistan) cricketers
Habib Bank Limited cricketers
Pakistan Test cricketers
Pakistan One Day International cricketers
Pakistan Twenty20 International cricketers
Cricketers at the 2011 Cricket World Cup
Cricketers at the 2015 Cricket World Cup
Pakistani cricketers
Lahore Eagles cricketers
Nagenahira Nagas cricketers
Jamaica Tallawahs cricketers
Cricketers from Lahore
Comilla Victorians cricketers
Fortune Barishal cricketers
Quetta Gladiators cricketers
Multan Sultans cricketers
Central Punjab cricketers
Kandy Falcons cricketers
People from Lahore